Lego Worlds is a Lego-themed sandbox game developed by Traveller's Tales and published by Warner Bros. Interactive Entertainment. The game allows players to build constructions in a 3D procedurally generated world. A beta version of the game was released on 1 June 2015 on Steam Early Access. It was released on 7 March 2017 for Microsoft Windows, PlayStation 4, and Xbox One. A version for Nintendo Switch was released on 5 September 2017 in North America and 8 September 2017 in Europe.

Gameplay
Lego Worlds is a sandbox video game which allows players to build a world made up of Lego bricks. The player is rewarded for collecting objects spread across the map with studs , an in-game currency. The player can build using the items they have encountered. Players can create their own world by using predefined Lego structures or using the "brick-by-brick editor tool". Players' appearances and outfits are customizable in the game. Terrain and environment can be modified via landscaping tools. A variety of vehicles, such as helicopters, and creatures are featured in the game. A multiplayer option and features for world-sharing have been added to the game through later updates.

Development
Prior to the game's official release, it was teased in the back of a Lego set's construction manual. It was formally announced on 1 June 2015 with a simultaneous early access release on Steam to allow the gaming community to provide feedback for continual improvements and the integration of additional content over time. The game left early access and Warner Bros released the game for PlayStation 4 and Xbox One on March 8, 2017. The Nintendo Switch version was released in September 2017.
In March 2023 it was reported by Nintendo Life that a mobile version codenamed Project Lego X was in development by Playdemic and later moved to TT Games after they were bought by EA.

Reception

Reception was generally positive, though players had mixed opinions in some cases. Metacritic gave the Nintendo Switch, PC, PlayStation 4, and Xbox One versions a score of 59/100, 71/100, 66/100, and 69/100 respectively. The game was nominated for "Family Game" at the 14th British Academy Games Awards.

Downloadable content
Two add-ons were released for the game. One, titled the Classic Space Pack, added a new biome, several characters, various creatures, vehicles and 2 brick builds: the Space Scooter Base and the Mineral Detector Base. 
The second pack, titled the Monsters Pack, added a new biome, a few characters, and three brick builds.

References

External links
 

Worlds
2017 video games
Warner Bros. video games
Traveller's Tales games
Open-world video games
Multiplayer and single-player video games
Nintendo Switch games
PlayStation 4 games
Windows games
Xbox One games
Video games using procedural generation